Archips mimicus is a species of moth of the family Tortricidae first described by Lord Walsingham in 1900. It is found in India, Sri Lanka and Malaysia. In the Catalogue of Life, the species is considered as a synonym of Archips dispilana.

Biology
It is superficially similar to Archips eupatris, but can be differentiated by having dull fuscous head, palpi, forelegs and midlegs.

The larvae feed on Morus, Nephelium lappaceum, Peltophorum, Piper, Prunus, Psidium guajava, Renanthera coccinea, Theobroma cacao, Uncaria gambir, Amherstia nobilis, Bouea macrophylla, Camellia sinensis, Capsicum, Citrus, Coffea liberica, Dalbergia sissoo, Duranta, Glycine max, Indigofera zollingeriana and Lantana species (including Lantana camara).

References

Moths described in 1900
Archips
Moths of Asia